The hammer and sickle (Russian: Serp i Molot: Серп и молот, "sickle and hammer") is the international symbol of communism.

The name may refer to:
 the flag of the Soviet Union, consisting of a yellow hammer and sickle and star on a red background
 Hammer & Sickle, a computer game
 Sickle and Hammer (film), a Russian silent film

See also
 Serp i Molot (disambiguation)